Louicius Don Deedson (born 11 February 2001) is a Haitian professional footballer who plays as a winger for Danish 1st Division club Hobro IK.

International career
He made his debut for Haiti national football team on 25 March 2021 in a World Cup qualifier against Belize.

Career statistics

Club

Notes

References

External links
 

2001 births
Living people
People from Ouest (department)
Association football wingers
Haitian footballers
Haitian expatriate footballers
Haiti international footballers
2021 CONCACAF Gold Cup players
Atlanta United FC players
Hobro IK players
Danish Superliga players
Danish 1st Division players
Expatriate men's footballers in Denmark
Haitian expatriate sportspeople in Denmark